Amvrakikos is a former municipality in the Arta regional unit, Epirus, Greece. Since the 2011 local government reform it is part of the municipality Arta, of which it is a municipal unit. The municipal unit has an area of 158.885 km2. Population 4,268 (2011). The seat of the municipality was in Aneza.

References

Populated places in Arta (regional unit)